Ağbaş, or Ağbash, is a village and municipality in the Davachi or Siazan Rayon of Azerbaijan. It has a population of 1,751.

Notable natives 

 Samir Zulfugarov — National Hero of Azerbaijan.

References

Populated places in Shabran District